Gold Creek is an unincorporated community on the western shore of Lake Conway in Faulkner County, Arkansas, United States. It is located along Interstate 40.

References

Unincorporated communities in Faulkner County, Arkansas
Unincorporated communities in Arkansas